Gunvorita is a genus of beetles in the family Carabidae, containing the following species:

 Gunvorita angusticeps Baehr, 1998
 Gunvorita apicalis Baehr, 2001
 Gunvorita besucheti Baehr, 1998
 Gunvorita bihamata Baehr, 2002 
 Gunvorita denticulata Baehr, 2001
 Gunvorita depressipennis Baehr, 1998 
 Gunvorita distinguenda Baehr, 2001
 Gunvorita elegans Landia, 1955
 Gunvorita globipalpis Baehr, 2001
 Gunvorita hamifera Baehr, 1998
 Gunvorita indica Darlington, 1968
 Gunvorita inermis Baehr, 1998
 Gunvorita laeviceps Baehr, 1998
 Gunvorita martensi Casale, 1985
 Gunvorita minor Baehr, 1998 
 Gunvorita nepalensis Baehr, 1998
 Gunvorita ovaliceps Baehr, 1998
 Gunvorita punctipennis Baehr, 1998
 Gunvorita schawalleri Baehr, 1998
 Gunvorita smetanai Baehr, 1998
 Gunvorita uncinata Baehr, 1998

References

Dryptinae